Natolin faction was a faction within the leadership of the communist Polish United Workers' Party (Polish: PZPR). Formed around 1956, shortly after the 20th Congress of the Communist Party of the Soviet Union, it was named after the place where its meetings took place, in a government villa in Natolin. The main opposition to the Natolines was the reformist Puławian faction, which united many party members of Jewish origin.

1956 in Poland
Political history of Poland
Polish United Workers' Party
Natolinians were against the post-Stalinist liberalization programs (the "thaw") and they proclaimed simple nationalist and anti-Soviet slogans as part of a strategy to gain power. The most well known members included Franciszek Jóźwiak, Wiktor Kłosiewicz, Zenon Nowak, Aleksander Zawadzki, Franciszek Mazur, Władysław Kruczek, Kazimierz Mijal, Władysław Dworakowski, Hilary Chełchowski. After the 8th Plenum of Central Committee of PZPR in October 1956 the faction suffered a major setback as the First Secretary of the Party, Wladysław Gomulka, chose to back (and in return, be supported by) the Pulawians. Both the Natoline and the Pulawian factions disappeared towards the end of the 1950s. Witold Jedlicki described the struggle between Natolins and the Pulawians in the booklet “Oafs and Jews” (Chamy i Żydy).

References 

Stalinism in Poland
Anti-revisionist organizations